Denshi may refer to:

Denshi block (or electronic block) is a small plastic box containing an electronic component
Denshi Sentai Denziman (Electronic Squadron Denziman), Toei's fourth entry to its Super Sentai series, broadcast 1980–1981
Fukuda Denshi Arena, football stadium in Chiba, Japan
Indigo Algorithm -Ai no Denshi Kisuuhou-, the seventh solo album by artist Daisuke Asakura
Sanwa Electronic, one of the leading producers of Japanese radio-controlled model transmitters